Manon Bollegraf and Larisa Neiland were the defending champions, but competed this year with different partners.

Bollegraf teamed up with Nicole Arendt and lost in quarterfinals to Maria Lindström and Maria Strandlund.

Neiland teamed up with Meredith McGrath and successfully defended her title, by defeating Lori McNeil and Helena Suková 7–5, 6–1 in the final.

Seeds

Draw

Draw

External links
 Official results archive (ITF)
 Official results archive (WTA)

Brighton International - Doubles
Brighton International